Auke Dennis Wiersma (born 19 February 1986) is a Dutch politician, who served as a member of the House of Representatives from 2017 to 2021. A member of the People's Party for Freedom and Democracy (VVD), he was appointed State Secretary for Social Affairs and Employment on 10 August 2021, succeeding Bas van 't Wout.

On 10 January 2022, he was appointed Minister for Primary and Secondary Education in the fourth Rutte cabinet.

References

1986 births
Living people
21st-century Dutch politicians
Dutch trade unionists
Members of the House of Representatives (Netherlands)
Ministers without portfolio of the Netherlands
People from Franeker
People's Party for Freedom and Democracy politicians
State Secretaries for Social Affairs of the Netherlands
University of Groningen alumni
20th-century Dutch people